The 2023 season will be the 16th season for the Indian Premier League franchise Chennai Super Kings. They will be one of ten teams to compete in the 2023 Indian Premier League. The side have previously won the IPL title four times.

Squad
 Players with international caps are listed in bold.

Administration and support staff

References

Chennai Super Kings seasons
2023 Indian Premier League